John Anderton Darwall-Smith (12 April 1912 – 22 June 1976) was an English first-class cricketer. Darwall-Smith played first-class cricket for Oxford University and the Free Foresters in mid-1930s, before serving in the Second World War.

Life, cricket and war service
Darwall-Smith was born at Marylebone in April 1912. He was educated at Winchester College, From Winchester he went up to Trinity College, Oxford. While at Oxford he made his debut in first-class cricket for Oxford University against the touring West Indians in 1933 at Oxford. He made three further first-class appearances for Oxford, playing two more matches in 1933 and one in 1934. He scored 83 runs and took 9 wickets in his four matches, but was unable to establish himself in the Oxford team. While at Oxford he played football for Oxford University and Corinthians. He made a final appearance in first-class cricket for the Free Foresters against Oxford University in 1937.

During the height of the Second World War, Darwall-Smith was commissioned into the King's Royal Rifle Corps as a second lieutenant in March 1941. He was mentioned in dispatches in March 1945, by which point he held the rank of captain. He died in hospital at Hemel Hempstead in June 1976. His younger brother, Randle Darwall-Smith, also played first-class cricket.

References

External links

1912 births
1976 deaths
Footballers from Marylebone
Cricketers from Greater London
People educated at Winchester College
Alumni of Trinity College, Oxford
English cricketers
Oxford University cricketers
English footballers
Oxford University A.F.C.
Corinthian F.C. players
Free Foresters cricketers
King's Royal Rifle Corps officers
British Army personnel of World War II
Association footballers not categorized by position